Jack Carter (c. 1902 – November 9, 1967) was an American actor. He is known for creating the role of Crown in the original Broadway production of Porgy (1927), and for starring in Orson Welles's stage productions including Macbeth (1936) and Doctor Faustus (1937). He appeared in a few motion pictures in the 1930s and 1940s.

Career
Jack Carter created the role of Crown in the original stage production of Porgy. | From 1928 to 1929 Carter portrayed Crown in a national tour production of Porgy. The tour included nine weeks in Chicago, six weeks in London, and performances in Boston, Philadelphia, Cincinnati, Washington, Cleveland, Pittsburgh, Baltimore, Detroit, San Francisco, Los Angeles, and cities in the northwestern United States and Canada From September 16 to October 24 in 1931 Carter portrayed the role of Dave Crocker in Singin' the Blues at the Liberty Theatre in New York. During 1934 Carter performance in a New York production of Stevedore as Lonnie Thompson at the Civic Repertory Theatre. He started the role in April through July, and resumed his role in October through November 1934.

He is perhaps best known for having starred in the Federal Theatre Project's 1936 New York production of William Shakespeare's Macbeth that came to be known as the Voodoo Macbeth. Orson Welles adapted and directed the play, moved its setting from Scotland to a fictional Caribbean island, recruited an entirely African American cast, and earned the nickname for his production from the Haitian vodou that fulfilled the rôle of Scottish witchcraft. In 1936, at the Lafayette Theatre in Harlem, New York, a free preview drew 3,000 more people than can be seated The show reportedly was sold out for all ten weeks. During its run at the Adelphi Theatre on Broadway, Carter completed only Act I of the July 15 performance, which was then completed by understudy Thomas Anderson. Beginning July 16, Maurice Ellis played the role of Macbeth in the remainder of the run at the Adelphi Theatre and on the subsequent national tour.

Welles later cast Carter as Mephistopheles in Doctor Faustus (1937), a Federal Theatre Project 891 production in which Welles played Faust.

Work

Theatre

Filmography

References

External links

1900s births
1967 deaths
20th-century American male actors
African-American male actors
Year of birth uncertain
Federal Theatre Project people